The Canadian Parliamentary Press Gallery is an association established to oversee rules and responsibilities of Canadian journalists when at Parliament Hill. The organization was formed in 1866 by Thomas White. During the early years of the association, the members were associated with political parties. Membership of the gallery is determined by the association, but, the final decision lies with the Speaker of the House of Commons. The headquarters of the organization is the National Press Building at 150 Wellington Street. Before Hansard was introduced in 1875, records were dependent upon the newspapers of the time.

Each province of Canada also has its own press gallery.

Related links 
 Press gallery
 Media in Canada
 List of Canadian journalists

External links 
 Parliamentary Press Gallery
 Article about the Press Gallery from Mapleleafweb.com
 "Parliamentary Press Gallery". The Canadian Encyclopedia article
 Lists of Members of the Press Gallery

1867 establishments in Ontario
Organizations established in 1867
Canadian journalism organizations
Mass media regulation in Canada
Journalism-related professional associations
Parliament of Canada
Press galleries